Venancio (Spanish or Tagalog), Venâncio (Portuguese), Venanzio (Italian) or Venantius (Latin) is a masculine given name. Venâncio is also a Portuguese surname. It may refer to

Given name
Venancio
Venancio Concepción, Filipino army general
Venancio Costa (born 1967), Spanish volleyball player
Venancio García (1921–1994), Spanish footballer 
Venancio Flores (1808–1868), Uruguayan political leader and general
Venancio José (born 1976), Spanish sprinter
Venancio Antonio Morin (1843–1919), Venezuelan military officer and politician
Venancio Ramos (born 1959), football striker from Uruguay
Venancio Roberto, 19th century governor of Guam
Venancio Serrano, Filipino military officer
Venancio Shinki (1932–2016), Peruvian painter

Venanzio
Giuseppe Venanzio Marvuglia (1729–1814), Italian architect 
Venanzio da Camerino, 16th century Italian painter
Venanzio Ortis (born 1955), Italian long-distance runner 
Venanzio Rauzzini (1746–1810), Italian composer, pianist, singing teacher and concert impresario

Venantius
 Venantius Fortunatus (530–600), Latin poet, bishop, and saint
 Venantius of Camerino (d. 250), aka Saint Venanzio, martyr, patron saint of Camerino
 Venantius, brother of Saint Honoratus (350–429)
 Venantius (consul 507), consul and son of Liberius
 Venantius (fl. 517–537), Bishop of the Roman Catholic Diocese of Viviers
 Venantius of Salona, a Bishop of Salona
 Venantius of Berri, an Abbot

Venâncio
Venâncio da Silva Moura (1942–1999), Minister of External Relations of Angola

Surname
Célio Gabriel de Almeida Venâncio (born 1986), Brazilian footballer
Cris Cyborg (born Cristiane Justino Venâncio in 1985), American-Brazilian mixed martial artist
Fernando Venâncio (born 1944), Portuguese writer
Frederico Venâncio (born 1993), Portuguese footballer
Kauiza Venancio (born 1987), Brazilian sprinter
Liliana Venâncio (born 1995), Angolan handball player
Ceará (footballer) (born Marcos Venâncio de Albuquerque in 1980), Brazilian footballer
Osman Menezes Venâncio Júnior (born 1992), Brazilian footballer
Pedro Venâncio (born 1963), Portuguese footballer
Rudimar Venâncio (born 1984), Brazilian futsal player
Scylla Venâncio (born 1917), Brazilian swimmer 
Tiago Venâncio (born 1987), Portuguese swimmer
Xavier Venâncio (born 1999), Portuguese footballer

See also
Venâncio Aires, a city in Brazil

Portuguese-language surnames
Italian masculine given names
Spanish masculine given names